The Miami Girls Foundation, also known as Miami Girls, is an American non-profit foundation. Miami Girls Foundation supports efforts of  feminist organizations and grass-root initiatives through media partnerships, social media campaigns and multimedia art projects.

Overview 
The Miami Girls Foundation was established in 2015 by Ekaterina Juskowski to challenge negative stereotypes of women from Miami. It received grants from Knight Foundation and Miami Foundation in support of its initiatives to promote female leaders of the city.

The inaugural "Miami Leaders" campaign by Miami Girls Foundation launched in 2016 during Women's History Month and presented profiles of thirty Miami women in politics, art, civil rights, tech, and business. In a 2016 Univision interview, founder Ekaterina Juskowski stated: "My purpose is to introduce the world to many women who are working to improve the city and the image of the 'Miami girls'. Through their stories, we hope to inspire others to strive to build a better future and a better perception of Miami."

In 2017 Miami Girls followed with the second campaign called "Miami Girls Making History", profiling thirty female leaders of such organizations as National Organization for Women (NOW), Planned Parenthood, SAVE, Women's Fund, and Women's March. The public awareness campaign during Women's History Month that year consisted of social media and media outreach and the Inside Out Project action in collaboration with the HistoryMiami Museum, where the portraits of Miami leaders were publicly displayed. Along with Julia Tuttle, the founder of Miami and the only female founder of a major American city, Miami Girls presented close to a hundred leaders including names as Ruth Shack of Miami Foundation,  Patricia Ireland of NOW, Marleine Bastien of  Family Action Network Movement (FANM),  Rebecca Fishman-Lipsey and other social justice activists.

During 2018 and 2019 Miami Girls Foundation partnered with the Miami Workers Center with the goal to bring to public's attention the issues of feminization of poverty and the status of domestic workers in the United States, including unfair compensation, stolen wages, human and labor trafficking, modern slavery and other women's issues connected to domestic work. The "Never Not Working" awareness campaign presented the voices of women performing domestic work professionally, victims of labor trafficking, community leaders and political activists. To create the art performance Miami Girls Foundation partnered with 100 political, social justice and non-profit organizations.  Among the people who supported the "Never Not Working" initiative were politicians Daniela Levine Cava and Michael Gongora.

Programs 
Miami Girls Foundation acts as a non-profit media and creative agency for organizations working to improve the status of women. Miami Girls collaborates with cultural, historical and educational institutions on recording the contributions of women  into the history of the City of Miami and South Florida region.

References

External links 
 

Foundations based in the United States
Organizations based in Miami
Miami-Dade County, Florida
Feminist art organizations in the United States
History of women in Florida